Rachel Schmidt (born ) is a New Zealand individual trampolinist, representing her nation at international competitions. She competed at world championships, including at the 2011 Trampoline World Championships.

Her brothers Callum Schmidt and Dylan Schmidt have also competed internationally in trampolining.

References

1994 births
Living people
New Zealand female trampolinists
Place of birth missing (living people)
21st-century New Zealand women